Herbert "Ertl" Erhard (6 July 1930 – 3 July 2010), also known as Herbert Erhardt, was a German footballer who played as a defender.

Club career 
Erhard played for SpVgg Fürth and Bayern Munich. He was known for his hard tackling, doggedness and captain-like performances. The German Football Association lists Erhardt in the top 20 best German defenders of all time, and Bayern Munich included him in their best 16 in a team made up in the 1980s of famous past players.

Erhard started out as a full back before being used as a half back by the mid-1950s. He then settled in the center half position by the end of the 1950s.

International career 
Erhard earned 50 caps for the West Germany national team, and was a member of the German team which won the 1954 FIFA World Cup. He also participated in two other World Cups, in 1958 and 1962.

Although Erhard did not play in the 1954 World Cup, coach Sepp Herberger toyed with the idea of changing his defense by adding Erhardt as the left back in the final game against Hungary instead of Werner Kohlmeyer, but eventually decided to keep the same line-up as in the semifinal against Austria. Herberger proved his tactical acumen by moving Erhardt to central defense in early 1958. In this new stopper role, Erhard proved to be a stand-out for Germany during the 1958 FIFA World Cup and remained Germany's standard stopper until his retirement from international play in September 1962. Between 1959 and 1962, Erhard had captained West Germany 16 times.

References

External links
 
 
 
 

1930 births
2010 deaths
Sportspeople from Fürth
German footballers
Footballers from Bavaria
Germany international footballers
Association football defenders
1954 FIFA World Cup players
1958 FIFA World Cup players
1962 FIFA World Cup players
FIFA World Cup-winning players
FC Bayern Munich footballers
SpVgg Greuther Fürth players
German football managers
FC Augsburg managers
BC Augsburg managers